Willard H. Clatworthy (October 16, 1915 – February 15, 2010) was a professor emeritus from University at Buffalo and a World War II veteran from Williamsville, New York. He is known for his work in BIBD designs and combinatorial mathematics. Clatworthy received his Ph.D. in the year 1952 from the University of North Carolina at Chapel Hill under the direction of R. C. Bose; Clatworthy authored papers with S. S. Shrikhande, and J. M. Cameron on BIBD designs.

Career
Clatworthy was born in Auxier, Kentucky. He graduated from Berea College, the University of Kentucky. Clatworthy worked at the Milwaukee School of Engineering, Wayne State University in Detroit, the University of North Carolina, Westinghouse Electric Corporation in Pittsburgh and with the National Bureau of Standards in Washington, D.C.
In 1962, he took a position as a professor in the mathematics department at University at Buffalo. In 1965 he was elected as a Fellow of the American Statistical Association.
He retired in 1987.

Select publications
 Tables of two-associate-class partially balanced designs, WH Clatworthy, JM Cameron, RC Bose, JA … - 1973 - US Dept. of Commerce, National …
 Some Theorems for Partially Balanced Designs, W. S. Connor and W. H. Clatworthy,  Ann. Math. Statist. Volume 25, Number 1 (1954), 100-112.

References

 
   Dr. W. H. Clatworthy, 94 died on Feb. 15, 2010

1915 births
2010 deaths
Combinatorialists
University of North Carolina at Chapel Hill alumni
University at Buffalo faculty
Berea College alumni
People from Williamsville, New York
Fellows of the American Statistical Association
Mathematicians from New York (state)
American military personnel of World War II